Kentucky Route 1450 (KY 1450) is a  state highway in the U.S. State of Kentucky. Its southern terminus is at KY 6313 in Pioneer Village and its northern terminus is at KY 61 in Louisville.

Major junctions

References

1450
1450
1450
Transportation in Louisville, Kentucky